This is a list of notable hardcore punk bands. Hardcore punk (sometimes referred to simply as hardcore) is an underground music genre that generally revolves around a thicker and more aggressive tone than earlier punk rock.



#

A

B

C

D

E

F

G

H

I

J

K

L

M

N

O

P

R

S 

 * Scalp

T

U

V

W

X

Y

Z

See also 
 List of Christian hardcore bands
 List of post-hardcore bands
 List of metalcore bands
 List of grindcore bands
 List of mathcore bands
 List of deathcore bands 
 List of pop punk bands

References 

 
Lists of hardcore punk bands